The Blip Festival was a festival that celebrated chiptune music with musical performances, workshops, and screenings of movies.  It was held annually starting in 2006 in New York City. In recent years, there have been international versions of Blip Festival held in Europe, Asia, and Australia. The festival is curated and organized by 8bitpeoples, one of the foremost labels in the chiptune scene, as well as local arts organization The Tank.  The New York festival (referred to simply as Blip Festival) has switched venues several times, beginning in 2006 at 15 Nassau Street in Manhattan, then moving to Eyebeam Art and Technology Center in 2007, and then being held in Brooklyn at The Bell House in 2008 and 2009. It went back to Eyebeam in 2011 and then the Gramercy Theatre in 2012.

The festival was the subject of a 2008 documentary film, Reformat the Planet, made by 2 Player Productions.  The documentary was an official selection of the 2008 South by Southwest Film Festival, and was shown on Pitchfork.tv.

After 7 Years and 11 Festivals across 4 continents it was announced that the October 2012 Blip Festival in Tokyo would be the last installment for the foreseeable future.

Blip Festival Europe 
The Blip Festival Europe was held once only in Aalborg, Denmark on July 24 to 25, 2009. The festival included Bit Shifter, Nullsleep, minusbaby, Hally, Binärpilot, Goto80, Bodenständig 2000, Bu Bu Kitty Fuckers and more.

Blip Festival Tokyo 
The Blip Festival Tokyo occurred for three consecutive years and was held for the first time on September 4–5, 2010 in Tokyo, Japan at Koenji High. Artists that played included Goto80, Bit Shifter, Nullsleep, YMCK, Saitone, Hally, Quarta330, Stu, Hip Tanaka, and more. It was consecutively held at Koenji High on October 22–23, 2011 and October 20–21, 2012.

Blip Festival Australia
The Blip Festival Australia was held for the first and only time on February 17–18, 2012 in Melbourne, Australia at Evelyn Hotel. Artists that played included Patric Catani, Bit Shifter, Nullsleep, Dot.AY, Abortifacient, Ten Thousand Free Men & Their Families, _ensnare_, 7bit Hero and more.

Past lineups

2012 lineup
Batsly Adams
Bit Shifter
Burnkit2600
CHiKA
Chipocrite
Chromacle
 :| kREW
Danimal Cannon
Deadbeatblast (music & visuals)
Dr. Von Pnok
Enso
Exilefaker
Flashheart
George & Jonathan
Graffiti Monsters
Infinity Shred
Kris Keyser
Jean Y. Kim
Kodek
Mikrosopht & the p.irateship
Minusbaby
Misfitchris
Monodeer
No Carrier
Nullsleep
Omodaka
Pulselooper
Radlib
Shitbird
Wizwars
Zen Albatross

2011 lineup
Anamanaguchi
BEASTMODE
Bit Shifter
Bubblyfish
Chipzel
cTrix
Deadbeatblast (visuals only)
enso
exileFaker
4mat
Henry Homesweet
Knife City
Raquel Meyers
minusbaby
M7Kenji (visuals)
NNNNNNNNNN
No Carrier
Noisewaves
Nullsleep
Party Time! Hexcellent! (visuals)
Tristan Perich
Ralp
Stagediver
Starscream
Peter Swimm
Talk To Animals
Ten Thousand Free Men & Their Families
Ultrasyd
vade
visualicious
Wet Mango
Zen Albatross

2009 lineup
Albino Ghost Monkey
Bit Shifter
Bubblyfish
Patric Catani
Chromix
The C-Men (visuals)
Disasterpeace
Eat Rabbit
enso (visuals)
failotron
Fighter X
Glomag
The Hunters (music and visuals)
I, Cactus
The J. Arthur Keenes Band
Je Deviens DJ en Trois Jours
Jean Y. Kim
Leeni
little-scale
Rosa Menkman (visuals)
minusbaby
No Carrier (visuals)
Nullsleep
Outpt (visuals)
Paris (visuals)
Psilodump
Rainbowdragoneyes
Silent Requiem
Starscream
David Sugar
tRasH cAn maN
Vblank (visuals)

2008 lineup
Anamanaguchi
Animal Style
Bit Shifter
Bubblyfish
Cheap Dinosaurs
Cow'p
Dubmood
Entter (visuals)
Glomag
Graffiti Monsters
IAYD
Ikuma
Jellica
Lissajou
Low-Gain
m-.-n
Meneo
minusbaby
Mr. Spastic
No Carrier (visuals)
nordloef
noteNdo (visuals)
Nullsleep
Paris Treantafeles (visuals)
Role Model
Sidabitball
Starscream
Stu
Sulumi
Syphus
The C-Men (visuals)
Tonylight
Trash80
Unicorn Dream Attack
USK
Vblank (visuals)
zabutom

2007 lineup
6955
8GB
Alex Mauer
Anamanaguchi
Bit Shifter
Bodenständig 2000
Bokusatsu Shoujo Koubou
Crazy Q
Firebrand Boy
Gijs Gieskes
gwEm
Lo-bat.
Mark DeNardo
Markus Schrodt
minusbaby
No Carrier (visuals)
noteNdo- (visuals)
Nullsleep
Oliver Wittchow
Otro (visuals)
Paza Rahm
Postal_M@rket
Rugar
Sabrepulse
Saskrotch
Tree Wave
virt
Yes, Robot

2006 lineup
Anamanaguchi
Goto80
Receptors
Starpause
Touchboy
Tugboat
virt
x|k
Bit Shifter
Coova
Mark DeNardo
Pepino
Quarta330
Rabato
Random
Herbert Weixelbaum
Cory Arcangel
Aonami
Covox
Crazy Q
The Depreciation Guild
Hally
Kplecraft
Bud Melvin
Nullsleep
Bubblyfish
Glomag
Tristan Perich
Portalenz
Saitone
Jeroen Tel
Neil Voss
YMCK
C-Men (visuals)
C-TRL Labs (visuals)
noteNdo (visuals)
Voltage Controlled (visuals)
Dan Winckler (visuals)

See also

List of electronic music festivals
Live electronic music

References

 The official website of the festival
 Reformat the Planet
 New York Times article about the festival
 ABC News article about the festival

External links

 

Video game music events
Chiptune
Music festivals established in 2006
Electronic music festivals in the United States
Electronic music festivals in Japan
Electronic music festivals in Denmark
Electronic music festivals in Australia
Music festivals in New York City